Jeffrey Senou (born 27 August 1992) is a French footballer, and a native of Benin, who plays as a forward for the club of Viry-Châtillon.

References

External links

1992 births
Living people
French footballers
French expatriate footballers
Expatriate footballers in Italy
A.C. Monza players
RC Strasbourg Alsace players
A.C. Montichiari players
Association football forwards